Just Until... is an EP by American rapper Cordae, released on April 22, 2021, through Atlantic Records. The four-track record includes guest appearances from Q-Tip and Young Thug.

Track listing
Credits adapted from Tidal.

References

2021 EPs
Albums produced by Eric Hudson
Albums produced by Q-Tip (musician)
Albums produced by Raphael Saadiq
Albums produced by Terrace Martin
Collaborative albums
Cordae EPs